Livingston is a town in and the county seat of Polk County, Texas. With a population of 5,640 at the 2020 census, it is the largest city in Polk County. It is located about 46 miles south of Lufkin and was originally settled in 1835 as Springfield. Its name was changed in 1846 to Livingston, when it was designated as the county seat of Polk County.

The Alabama-Coushatta Indian Reservation is located to the east of Livingston. This people traditionally occupied territory in what is now east Texas and Louisiana. The 2000 census reported a resident population of 480 persons within the reservation. The tribe has nearly 1200 enrolled members.

Geography

Livingston is located at  (30.709518, –94.934443).

Elevation: 148 ft

The zip code is 77351 for the general area of Livingston.

Demographics

As of the 2020 United States census, there were 5,640 people, 1,951 households, and 1,268 families residing in the town.

The population in the 2010 census was 5,335, and was estimated to be 5,128 in 2018.
As of the census of 2000, the population density was 649.9 inhabitants per square mile (250.9/km). The 2,358 housing units averaged 282.1 per square mile (108.9/km). The racial makeup of the town was 70.38% White, 18.50% African American, 0.64% Native American, 0.83% Asian, 8.08% from other races, and 1.56% from two or more races. About 13.90% of the population were Hispanic or Latino of any race.

Of the 2,048 households, 34.4% had children under the age of 18 living with them, 45.4% were married couples living together, 16.4% had a female householder with no husband present, and 34.5% were not families. About 30.9% of all households were made up of individuals, and 15.7% had someone living alone who was 65 years of age or older. The average household size was 2.50 and the average family size was 3.13.

In the town, the population was distributed as 27.7% under the age of 18, 9.1% from 18 to 24, 26.5% from 25 to 44, 19.7% from 45 to 64, and 17.1% who were 65 years of age or older. The median age was 35 years. For every 100 females, there were 85.0 males. For every 100 females age 18 and over, there were 79.2 males.

The median income for a household in the town was $31,424, and for a family was $37,868. Males had a median income of $30,318 versus $21,774 for females. The per capita income for the town was $17,214. About 18.2% of families and 22.3% of the population were below the poverty line, including 27.7% of those under age 18 and 17.4% of those age 65 or over.
 
In the 2010 Census, Livingston lost 1.8% of its population.2010 Census for Livingston, Texas

Government and infrastructure
The United States Postal Service operates the Livingston Post Office.

The Livingston Municipal Airport, operated by the City of Livingston, is located in West Livingston.

Nearby West Livingston has the Texas Department of Criminal Justice  Allan B. Polunsky Unit. Since 1999 this prison has been the location of Texas's death row.

A few miles outside of Livingston is the IAH Polk County Secure Adult Detention Center, which houses around 700 immigrant men daily who have been detained by federal agents of Immigration and Customs Enforcement. Run by the  private-prison company Community Education Centers, the facility has frequently been criticized for its subpar treatment of migrants. It is ranked as one of the 10 worst detention centers in the nation, which are the subject of a nationwide campaign by activists to close them.

Local government
Livingston has a manager-council system of government. It elects a mayor at-large, and has a city council made up of members elected from single-member districts. The city council hires a professional city manager to handle operations. The current mayor is Judy Cochran.

Economy
The major employers in Livingston are lumber operations and the Polunsky Unit state prison in West Livingston.

Livingston is the headquarters to two regional bank systems, the First National Bank and the First State Bank.

First State Bank has its main office in downtown Livingston and branches in Livingston (west side of town on Highway 190), Onalaska, and Shepherd.

First National Bank has its main office on Highway 190 and branches in downtown Livingston and Onalaska.

Transportation
The city's airport, Livingston Municipal Airport (LMA) is located to the southwest of the city.  It is classified as a general-aviation facility serving private aircraft.

Major highways:
  U.S. Highway 59
 U.S. 59 is scheduled to be upgraded to  Interstate 69.
  U.S. Highway 190
  State Highway 146

Education
The City of Livingston is served by the Livingston Independent School District.

The Texas Legislature designated Polk County as within the boundary of Angelina College's district. Polk County Community College opened in the fall of 2014. The college offers various classes and two-year associate degrees.

Recreation

Lake Evelyn is within the borders of Camp Cho-Yeh, which began operation in the 1940s; it continues to operate as a summer camp and retreat center. Cho-Yeh means 'land of tall pines', and was so named because of the large pine trees on the property. Cho-Yeh is also used by Texas A&M Galveston for their yearly Fish Camp to introduce TAMUG students to the traditions of the university system.

Notable people

 Laci Kaye Booth, American Idol contestant 2019, top-five finalist
 Paul Carr, NFL and University of Houston football player; he worked and lived in Livingston as the elementary school physical-education coach
 Billy Eli, musician and songwriter
 Clem Fain, Jr., Texas state senator, honorary chief of and Texas agent for the Alabama-Coushatta
 Percy Foreman, criminal defense attorney
Annette Gordon-Reed, Harvard historian and law professor, winner of the Pulitzer Prize for History and the National Book Award for Nonfiction, was born here and grew up in nearby Conroe, Texas
 Lyda Green, Alaska state senator for 14 years
 Margo Jones, stage director who launched the careers of Tennessee Williams and Ray Walston, and directed Williams's The Glass Menagerie on Broadway
 Long King, Principal chief of the Coushatta Indians
 Sally Mayes, Award-winning Broadway actress and singer; Livingston named a street in her honor
 Mark Moseley, Super Bowl XVII and the 1982 National Football League Most Valuable Player Award as a placekicker
 Lt. James N. Parker, Jr., Co-pilot of crew number 9 in the Doolittle Raid (Thirty Seconds Over Tokyo), awarded the Distinguished Flying Cross 
 Gene Phillips, Professional basketball player
 Isaac Newton Turner, Captain in the Civil War with Hood's Brigade
 Samuel M. Whitside, Commanded Camp Livingston in the late 1860s during the reconstruction period
 Brad Womack, star of ABC's The Bachelor seasons 11 and 15

Media

 KCTL Television
 KETX Television
 STRYK TV – Video Country Locally owned & operated by Mouser Media
 KETX Radio (1440 KETX (AM)
 KEHH
 PolkCountyToday.com (news website)
 Polk County Enterprise (newspaper), East Texas News (online version of the "Polk County Enterprise")
 Livingston Dunbar (1A-PVIL) state champions 1954
 Livingston Dunbar (1A-PVIL) state champions 1958
 Livingston Dunbar (1A-PVIL) state runner-up 1959

High-school basketball:
 Livingston High (all schools in one division) 1939
 Livingston Dunbar (1A-PVIL) Runner Up 1952

Tourism and recreation

Destinations 
 Lake Livingston 
 Lake Livingston State Park 
 Pedigo Park
 Alabama-Coushatta Indian Reservation

Attractions 
 Light of Saratoga at Bragg Road
 391 Historical Markers
 Polk County Museum
 Swartout: Former River Ferry Town, now a ghost town

Events 
 Trinity Neches Livestock show and Rodeo (founded in 1945)
 Polk County Fireworks on Lake Livingston
 Annual Jingle Bell Fun Run and Walk
 Hometown Christmas
 5k Dam Run

Entertainment references 
Lake Livingston was featured on the third episode of the first season of the television show, River Monsters, which airs on Animal Planet. The host, Jeremy Wade, was searching for alligator gar.

References

External links

 Livingston City website
 Livingston-Polk County Chamber of Commerce
 Livingston ISD
 Lake Livingston Recreational Home Page
 Dentists In Livingston TX

Towns in Polk County, Texas
Towns in Texas
County seats in Texas
Populated places established in 1835